The Magic of Christmas is a collaborative Christmas album by American recording artist Natalie Cole and London Symphony Orchestra, released on September 21, 1999, by  Elektra Records. The album is a follow-up to Snowfall on the Sahara. It reached peak positions of number 157 on the US Billboard 200 and number 84 on Billboards Top R&B/Hip-Hop Albums chart. A number of the tracks on The Magic of Christmas were first released on the 1998 album Christmas With You, which was produced exclusively for Hallmark Cards.

Critical reception 

AllMusic's Heather Phares awarded the album 2.5 out of 5 stars and described the collection of songs as "traditional yet sophisticated". She also highlighted "O Tannenbaum", "The 12 Days of Christmas", and "The Christmas Song".

Track listing 
All tracks producer by Fred Salem.

Note
"The Christmas Song" uses samples from a recording of "The Christmas Song", as performed by Nat King Cole.

Personnel 
Adapted from album booklet.

 Natalie Cole – vocals
 London Symphony Orchestra – orchestra (strings, horns, woodwinds, percussion)
 Terry Trotter – grand piano
 Christopher Argent – organ (1-4, 7)
 Bob Krogstad – musical arrangements (1, 2, 3, 5-8, 10), orchestra conductor
 Robert MacGimsey – musical arrangements (4)
 Peter Wilhousky – musical arrangements (9)
 Nat King Cole – vocals (1)

Production 
 Fred Salem – producer
 Dick Carter – executive producer 
 Toby Foster – recording, engineer, mixing
 Al Schmitt – mixing
 Doug Sax – mastering at The Mastering Lab (Hollywood, California)
 Alli Truch – art direction, design 
 David Jensen – photography 
 Cecille Parker – stylist 
 Tara Posey – make-up 
 Janet Zeitoun – hair stylist

Charts

References

External links 
 

1999 Christmas albums
Christmas albums by American artists
Collaborative albums
Elektra Records albums
Natalie Cole albums